Abragão is a parish of Penafiel, Portugal.

Populated places in Porto District
Freguesias of Penafiel
Towns in Portugal